Anti- is an American record label founded in 1999 as a sister label to Epitaph Records. 

Founded by Andy Kaulkin, Anti- first gained attention by releasing Tom Waits's Grammy Award–winning Mule Variations in 1999. Other veteran recording artists such as rhythm and blues singers Solomon Burke, Bettye LaVette and Marianne Faithfull have signed to Anti- after leaving other labels.

Andy Kaulkin
Kaulkin began working for the Epitaph label. His role was looking after the label's data management system. In 1995, he was head of marketing. He eventually worked his way up to become the president for the label, and worked there until 1998. Later he founded Anti-. Under Kaulkin's stewardship, the label began with the release of Mule Variations by Tom Waits which was met with success.

Other artists signed by Kaulkin include Mavis Staples, who came to the label as a result of a meeting between Kaulkin and her manager, and Jade Jackson, whose vivid storytelling attracted Kaulkin.

As a musician, Kaulkin played piano on "Haggard (Like I've Never Been Before)", which was the title track of Merle Haggard's album Like Never Before. He had multiple roles as composer, musician and producer on the Blues Got Soul album by King Ernest.

Roster

 Mose Allison
 Alfa Mist
 Antibalas
 Arc Iris
 Buju Banton
 Blackalicious
 Billy Bragg
 Book of Knots
 Booker T.
 Solomon Burke
 Busdriver
 Kate Bush (US)
 Cadence Weapon
 Calexico
 Neko Case
 Nick Cave and the Bad Seeds
 The Coup
 Christopher Paul Stelling
 Christian Lee Hutson
 Dead Man's Bones
 Deafheaven
 Delicate Steve
 Dr. Dog
 DeVotchKa
 Doe Paoro 
 The Dream Syndicate
 The Drums
 Ramblin' Jack Elliott
 Roky Erickson
 Marianne Faithfull
 Tim Fite
 Fleet Foxes
 The Frames
 Sage Francis
 Michael Franti
 Galactic
 A Girl Called Eddy
 Girlpool
 Greg Graffin
 Grinderman
 Petra Haden
 Merle Haggard
 Curtis Harding
 Jade Jackson
 Japandroids
 John K. Samson
 Joe Henry
 Kelly Hogan
 Jolie Holland
 Islands
 Eddie Izzard
 Daniel Lanois
 Bettye LaVette
 Sierra Leone's Refugee All Stars
 Lido Pimienta
 The Locust
 Lost in the Trees
 Jason Lytle (ex-Grandaddy)
 Man Man
 Cass McCombs
 The Milk Carton Kids
 Bob Mould
 Muggs
 Os Mutantes
 N.A.S.A.
 One Day as a Lion (until 2011)
 Beth Orton
 Alec Ounsworth
 Pete Philly & Perquisite
 The Promise Ring
 Purr
 Rain Machine
 The Robocop Kraus
 Rogue's Gallery: Pirate Ballads, Sea Songs, and Chanteys
 Saintseneca
 The Tallest Man on Earth
 Xavier Rudd
 Xenia Rubinos
 Andy Shauf
 Simian Mobile Disco
 Elliott Smith (posthumously)
 Solillaquists of Sound
 Spoon (Europe only)
 Mavis Staples
 Son Little
 The Swell Season
 Yann Tiersen
 Title Fight
 Tricky
 Porter Wagoner
 Tom Waits
 William Elliott Whitmore
 The Weakerthans
 Chuck E. Weiss
 Wilco
 Wynonna & the Big Noise
 Youth Group

References

External links
 
 
 Anti/Epitaph statistics and previews at Last.FM
 Anti statistics at Last.FM

Record labels established in 1999
Alternative rock record labels
Indie rock record labels
Folk record labels
American country music record labels
Rock record labels
American hip hop record labels
Soul music record labels
Contemporary R&B record labels
Reggae record labels
1999 establishments in the United States